Sir Leonard Morton Wright (1906 – 22 October 1967) was a Dunedin businessman and was Mayor of Dunedin from 1950 to 1959.

He was born in Australia and educated in Sydney. He married Cecily Bell in 1936.

He was a tea importer and formed his own business in 1927. He was on the Dunedin City Council for ten years, was Chairman of the Otago Development Council, and was honorary tea controller from 1941 to 1950. He was a rugby referee and sports administrator. In 1953, Wright was awarded the Queen Elizabeth II Coronation Medal. He was appointed a Knight Bachelor in the 1957 New Year Honours.

Morton died at Dunedin on 22 October 1967, and his ashes were buried at Andersons Bay Cemetery.

References

1906 births
1967 deaths
20th-century New Zealand businesspeople
Mayors of Dunedin
Businesspeople from Sydney
Australian emigrants to New Zealand
New Zealand Knights Bachelor
New Zealand rugby union referees
New Zealand sports executives and administrators
Burials at Andersons Bay Cemetery
20th-century New Zealand politicians